Xichan Temple, may refer to:

 Xichan Temple (Fujian), in Fuzhou, Fujian, China
 Xichan Temple (Hunan), in Huarong County, Hunan, China
 Xichan Temple (Sichuan), in Xichang, Sichuan, China